Flyford Flavell is a village in Worcestershire , it has a traditional pub in the centre of the village adjacent to the village green and a first school (rated Good by Ofsted in November 2016). A garage and another pub lie on the periphery of the village and the nearest shop is 3 miles.

Villages in Worcestershire